Jin Di ( or ; September 1921 – 7 November 2008) was a Chinese translator. He was the first Chinese translator who translated James Joyce's Ulysses into Chinese language, a project that took 16 years to complete.

Biography
Jin was born in Wuxing County (now Huzhou), Zhejiang, in September 1921.

After graduating from National Southwestern Associated University in 1945, he worked as a translator in the U.S. News Office in China. He started to publish works in early-1940s. In 1947 he taught at Peking University. In 1955 he was a translator in China Construction magazine. In 1957 he taught at Nankai University. After the Cultural Revolution in 1977, he taught at Tianjin Foreign Studies University.

Jin's translation career commenced when, in collaboration with British poet Robert Payne, he began to translate Shen Congwen's collection of stories, The Chinese Earth, into English and had it published in Britain in 1947. In 1978, at the invitation of the Chinese Academy of Social Sciences, he began translating James Joyce's famous novel Ulysses. In 1982, he went to live in the United States and continued his translation of Ulysses. In 1993, Taiwanese Jiuge Publishing House published Ulysses (Volume 1), and he became the first Chinese translator of Ulysses. A few months later, another version of Ulysses, translated by the couple of Xiao Qian and Wen Jieruo, was published, and there was some resentment between Jin Di and the couple.

He was a visiting professor at Oxford University, Yale University, University of Notre Dame, Drexel University, University of Virginia, National Humanities Center, University of Washington, University of Oregon. In 2005, Jin became the first Asian to be conferred with an honorable membership in the Irish Translators' and Interpreters' Association (ITIA). Jin died in the United States, on November 7, 2008.

Translation
 Ulysses

Awards
 2001 "Senior Translator" – Chinese Translation Association

References

1921 births
2008 deaths
National Southwestern Associated University alumni
Writers from Huzhou
Academic staff of Nankai University
English–Chinese translators
People's Republic of China translators
Republic of China translators
Educators from Huzhou
20th-century Chinese translators
21st-century Chinese translators
Chinese expatriates in the United Kingdom
Chinese expatriates in the United States